Richard Paul Horner (born July 2, 1957) is an American politician. He was elected to the North Carolina State Senate in 2016. A Republican, he serves the 11th district.

References

Living people
Republican Party North Carolina state senators
1957 births
21st-century American politicians